Jeremias Falck (1610–1677) was an engraver of the 17th century Baroque, born and active in the Polish–Lithuanian Commonwealth. He signed most of his over 300 works as J. Falck, sculp., a few as Falck Polonus (Falck the Pole) or Falck Gedanensis (Falck of Gdańsk).

Life and professional career
Born probably around 1610 in Danzig (Gdańsk), in Royal Prussia (a fief of the Crown of Poland). Falck studied and worked with Wilhelm Hondius. In 1639 he moved to Paris, and in 1649 he became Royal Swedish engraver for Queen Christina in Sweden until 1654, when she became a Catholic. He then went to  the Netherlands, where he engraved a portrait of Willem Blaeu, and to Germany. In 1662 in Hamburg he published 16 engravings of flowers and plants. He engraved the royals of the places he worked and he intermittently worked in Danzig.

Jeremias' brother Hans Falck was a Messerschmidt (knife smith) at Neugarten, Danzig. In 1650 Jeremias' marriage in Danzig is recorded and later Hans and his Catharine were recorded as witnesses to the birth of Jeremias' child. A letter by Jeremias Falck from 1658 stated ...ich habe eine geraume Zeit sehr grosse Schmerzen im rechten Arm (...that for a long time he has great pain in his right arm).

He lived again in Danzig. Many of Falck's engravings are based on portraits by Daniel Schultz and other painters. Falck's work was admired and used by publisher Georg Forster, such as engraved illustrations for "Selenography" of Johannes Hevelius and "Orationes" of Jerzy Ossoliński, Great Crown Chancellor of the Polish–Lithuanian Commonwealth.

Falck lies buried in St. Peter and St. Paul's Church. The 1890 book with dedication by the great-grandson Herman Eugen Falk thanks a number of Polish writers who collected works by Falck.

Of about three hundred portraits and pictures, which were personally inspected by J.C. Block for his book, nearly all works show J. Falck, sculp., but there are some that identify him as Swedish sculptor, when he was in salaried employment in Sweden. There are also listed about nine copper-etching Portrait Ovals mostly of Polish Bishops by Falck alone or with name: Dankert or Georg Förster (Georg Forster). These nine metal ovals are mounted on rectangles and the rectangles are inscribed with "Jeremias Falck Polonus".

Gallery

References

Literature 
 Thieme-Becker, Bd. 11, S. 213-214
 AKL, Band 36, 2003, S. 339
 Block, J. C., Jeremias Falck, sein Leben und seine Werke: mit vollständigem alphabetischen und chronologischen Register sämmtlicher Blätter, sowie Reproductionen nach des Künstlers besten Stichen, C. Hinstorff (G. Ehrke)  
 Michael Bryan, Dictionary of Painters and Engravers, Biographical and Critical, 1849

External links

 
 
  300 portraits by F.Falck,sculp 9 ovals on rectangles reading J.Falck Polonus
 Polonus reference in Polish
 Jeremias Falck's gallery at malarze.com
 Georgius Ossolinski Portrait engraved by J.Falck, after a painting by Bartholomäus Strobel
 Deutsche Fotothek

1610 births
1677 deaths
Baroque painters
Artists from Gdańsk
People from Royal Prussia